The , also known as the JGA, is Japanese national association of golf courses, clubs and facilities and the governing body of golf for Japan.

Competitions organized by JGA
Japan Open Golf Championship
Japan Women's Open Golf Championship
Japan Senior Open Golf Championship
Japan Amateur Golf Championship
Japan Women's Amateur Golf Championship
Japan Junior Golf Championship

See also
Japan Golf Tour
LPGA of Japan Tour

External links

National members of the Asia Pacific Golf Confederation
Japan
Association
Amateur golf
Golf Association